Pope Sergius could refer to:
Pope Sergius I (pope 687–701)
Pope Sergius II (pope 844–847)
Pope Sergius III (pope 904–911)
Pope Sergius IV (pope 1009–1012)

Sergius